Ostigliano is a southern Italian village and the only hamlet (frazione) of Perito, a municipality in the province of Salerno, Campania. As of 2011, its population was 431.

History
The village, whose toponym comes from the Latin word Hostilius, was settled since the Middle Ages. Its main church, dedicated to John the Baptist, was built during the 16th century.

Geography
Located in central-northern Cilento and transcluded into its national park, Ostigliano spans above a hill, on a ridge between the valley and the reservoir of Alento river, and the nearby hilltown of Perito (6 km far).

It is 7.7 km far from Piano Vetrale, 8 from Orria, 10 from Rutino, 14 from Cicerale, 19 from Agropoli; and 4 from the exit "Perito" of the national highway SS18/var.

Gallery

See also
Cilentan dialect

References

External links

Frazioni of the Province of Salerno
Localities of Cilento